Glumsø is a railway town, with a population of 2,121 (1.January 2022), located on the southern part of Zealand in Denmark. Until 1.January 2007 it was the seat of Suså Municipality.

Glumsø Station is located in Glumsø, serving the Sydbanen line. The station was heavily redesigned in late 2009. Before being redesigned it used to serve German ICE trains on the Copenhagen-Hamburg line, although ICE trains now just pass through.

Landmarks
Local landmarks include Glumsø Church, the heritage listed Glumsø Rectory and the manor house Næsbyholm.

Notable people 
 Christian Frederik Bielke (1670-1709) a Danish military officer, from 1673 to 1709 the owner of Næsbyholm
 Mikkel Bech (born 1994 in Næstved) a Danish speedway rider, raised in Glumsø.

References 

Cities and towns in Region Zealand
Næstved Municipality